Bulanda may refer to:

Monika Bulanda, Poland-born musician and visual artist
Balanta language, west Africa
Bulanda, Kazakhstan, river
, river
, aka Bulanda, a famous Goral baca (alpine master shepherd), see Gorce National Park
 (1882-1951), Polish archaeologist rector of Lviv University